The crested goshawk (Accipiter trivirgatus) is a bird of prey from tropical Asia. It is related to other diurnal raptors such as eagles, buzzards (or buteos) and harriers, and thus placed in the family Accipitridae.

Description
This raptor has short broad wings and a long tail, both adaptations to manoeuvring through trees. It is 30–46 cm in length, with the female much larger than the male. The larger size and a short crest, clearly visible in profile, are the best distinctions from its relative, the besra (A. virgatus).

The male has a dark brown crown, grey head sides and black moustachial and throat stripes. The pale underparts are patterned with rufous streaks on the breast and bars on the belly. The larger female has a browner head and brown underpart streaks and bars. The juvenile has pale fringes to its head feathers, and the underpart background colour is buff rather than white.

The flight is a characteristic "slow flap, slow flap, straight glide", similar to other Accipiter species such as the northern goshawk (A. gentilis).

Range and ecology
The crested goshawk breeds in southern Asia, from India and Sri Lanka to southern China, Indonesia, Taiwan, and the Philippines. It is primarily a lowland bird, and an all-year resident. Even in upland habitat it is resident in winter, for example in the Himalayas foothills of Bhutan or in Sal (Shorea robusta) forest in India's Dehradun district. In these lands at the northern end of its range, it is generally very rare however. Essentially it is limited to tropical and warm subtropical areas.
In Malaysia and Singapore there is increasing evidence of this species adapting to life in urban centres. 

Like its relatives, this secretive forest bird hunts birds, mammals and reptiles in woodland, relying on surprise as it flies from a perch to catch its prey unaware. It builds a stick nest in a tree and lays two or three eggs.

The ischnoceran louse Degeeriella storeri is a parasite of this bird; it is not yet known from any other host species. On the other hand, Kurodaia fulvofasciata, an amblyceran louse parasitizing the crested goshawk, is widely found on birds of prey throughout the Holarctic.

In Hong Kong, A. trivirgatus is a protected species under Wild Animals Protection Ordinance Cap 170. It can be found in Kam Shan Country Park.

Taxonomy
The crested goshawk includes the following recognized subspecies:
 A. t. indicus (Hodgson, 1836)
 A. t. formosae - Mayr, 1949
 A. t. peninsulae - Koelz, 1949
 A. t. layardi (Whistler, 1936)
 A. t. trivirgatus (Temminck, 1824)
 A. t. niasensis - Mayr, 1949
 A. t. javanicus - Mayr, 1949
 A. t. microstictus - Mayr, 1949
 A. t. palawanus - Mayr, 1949
 A. t. castroi - Manuel & Gilliard, 1952
 A. t. extimus - Mayr, 1945

Footnotes

References

 Dalgleish, R.C. (ed.) (2003): Birds and their associated Chewing Lice: Accipitridae. Version of 2003-AUG-30. Retrieved 2009-JUN-23.
 Elbel, Robert E. & Price, Roger D. (1973): Three new Oriental and New Guinean Degeeriella (Mallophaga: Philopteridae). Pacific Insects 15(1) : 95-101. PDF fulltext
 Grimmett, Richard; Inskipp, Carol, Inskipp, Tim & Byers, Clive (1999): Birds of India, Pakistan, Nepal, Bangladesh, Bhutan, Sri Lanka, and the Maldives. Princeton University Press, Princeton, N.J.. 
 Inskipp, Carol; Inskipp, Tim & Sherub (2000): The ornithological importance of Thrumshingla National Park, Bhutan. Forktail 14: 147–162. PDF fulltext 
 Singh, A.P. (2002): New and significant records from Dehra Dun valley, lower Garhwal Himalayas, India. Forktail 18: 151–153. PDF fulltext
Shepherd, C. R. (2018). Crested Goshawk Accipiter trivirgatus may adapt well to life in urban areas across its range in Asia. BirdingASIA 29: 34–35.

crested goshawk
crested goshawk
Birds of Hainan
Birds of South Asia
Birds of Southeast Asia
Birds of Taiwan
crested goshawk